Cis-Lunar was established to make computer-controlled closed-circuit automatic rebreathers for scuba diving. Some of its production models were in a streamlined casing. The firm's first plan was to develop spacesuit kit. The dot com crash in early 2000 prevented Cis-Lunar from financing mass production of the MK5 rebreather. The MK5 included design elements aimed at preventing system and mission failures.

The word cis-lunar came from Latin and means "on this side of the moon" or "not beyond the moon", and may refer to the scuba sets described here, or it may refer generically to space travel or astronomy.

In 2005, Poseidon, a Swedish diving equipment manufacturer that is a wholly owned subsidiary of DP Scandinavia, acquired Cis-Lunar's technology and retained its founder, Bill Stone of Stone Aerospace, to lead an international engineering team to design a new closed circuit rebreather, the Cis-Lunar Mark VI Discovery.

The Cis-Lunar Mark VI rebreather employs many revolutionary design elements, such as discarding the customary three oxygen sensors and their voting logic in favor of a primary oxygen sensor with constant auto-cell validation and auto-calibration through the entire dive envelope, with a secondary oxygen sensor for redundancy. The Mark VI also uses a four-computer design that correlates data over its digital communications network to its controlling resource algorithm to monitor such data like exact values, gas cylinder low or excessive consumption or metabolic rates, sensor values, calculated derivative sensor values, calculated response data values, etc.

Bill Stone of Cis-Lunar and Richard Pyle have been interviewed by ScubaMagazine to explain the design philosophy behind the Mark VI and its operation; the interview was made available as a downloadable video.

See also

References

External links
http://www.nwdesigns.com/rebreathers/CisLunar.htm (Mk VP images)
https://web.archive.org/web/20050104195047/http://www.photosub.dk/stock_specials_CIS.htm (images)
http://poseidon.com/rebreather (Poseidon rebreathers)

Rebreathers
Rebreather makers